The following list of instrument-resolved minor planets consists of minor planets whose disks have been resolved, whether by telescope, a visit by an uncrewed spacecraft, or by observing the occultation of a background star from multiple sites. Disk resolution allows the density of an body to be computed, providing useful information about the internal composition. It can also be used to determine the shape of the object, to search for albedo features, and to look for companions.

Techniques

Because of their distance from Earth and their small dimension, minor planets such as asteroids represent a challenge for astronomical instruments to resolve. Even two of the largest objects in the asteroid belt, 2 Pallas and 4 Vesta, have maximum angular diameters of less than an arcsecond. With a ground-based optical telescope, resolution of these objects through the Earth's thick atmosphere can require techniques such as speckle interferometry or adaptive optics.

Radio telescopes such as Arecibo or Goldstone have been used to observe asteroids. This technique can be used to measure the Doppler shifts and radar cross-sections of the bodies, while more detailed studies allow three-dimensional shape models to be built. The first radar detection of a minor planet was 1566 Icarus by JPL astronomer Richard M. Goldstein in June 1968. This was followed by 1685 Toro in 1972. A regular program of radar observation of the asteroid belt asteroids was begun in 1980 at Arecibo. Goldstone joined the effort in 1990. Together, they observed 37 main-belt asteroids between 1980–1997.

A more direct approach to asteroid study, allowing the object to be examined greater detail, is to send a spacecraft to either make a fly-by or go into orbit. The first such asteroid to be imaged in this manner was 951 Gaspra in 1991 by the Galileo spacecraft. In 2000, the NEAR Shoemaker spacecraft went into orbit around 433 Eros after making a fly-by of 253 Mathilde in 1997.

Objects
The tables below list selected orbital elements and physical properties of radar-detected minor planets listed by region of the Solar System: asteroid belt, near-Earth objects, or trans-Neptunian objects. The semi-major axis (a), orbital eccentricity (e), inclination (i) to the ecliptic, and orbital period (P) is shown. Where possible, the number of decimals in maintained to the same limited level of significance in each column. This is because further detail is not needed for comparison purposes, and because the values can slightly change over time due to new measurements or gravitational perturbations. Where the SMASS spectral type is not available, the Tholen spectral type is listed in square brackets. For more detailed information on these objects, see their respective articles.

Asteroid belt

Near-Earth asteroids

Trans-Neptunian objects

See also
 Steven J. Ostro

References

External links

Lists of minor planets